Tathagata (He Xuntian) (如来如去 ) is a music work
for Music Ceremony: Eulogy of Lingshan Lucky,
composed by He Xuntian.

Summary 
Tathagata has eight movements: 
 The Heaven Outside of Heaven 天外天
 Tathagata 达塔伽达
 Meditation 冥思
 The Heart of the Void 虚空之心
 The Realm of Forms 色界 
 The Wind the Trees 树有风
 The Dance of the Four Dharmadhatus 四方之舞
 Tathagata 如来如去

First performance
March 29, 2009
Lingshan Buddhist Palace, Wuxi

References

External links

Compositions by He Xuntian
2009 compositions